Symphlebia obliquefasciatus is a moth in the family Erebidae. It was described by Reich in 1935. It is found in Brazil.

References

Moths described in 1935
Symphlebia
Arctiinae of South America